Francis Yohana Kalabat (born May 13, 1970) is a bishop of the Chaldean Catholic Church in the United States and serves the over 150,000 Chaldo-Assyrians in the Detroit area.

Life
He began undergraduate (philosophy) studies at the University of San Diego's Saint Francis de Sales Center for Priestly Formation, in San Diego County, California. Subsequently, he began the requisite graduate theological training for the Chaldean Catholic priesthood at Sacred Heart Major Seminary, in Detroit, Michigan. Ordained a priest on July 5, 1995, he was appointed Parochial Vicar (Associate Pastor) of Mother of God Church in Southfield, Michigan, the city where the Eparchy has its cathedral. Since 2001, Eparch Kalabat has been Pastor of Saint Thomas Church in West Bloomfield, Director of Vocations for the Eparchy, and has been involved with the Center for Re-Evangelization. He speaks Arabic, English and Aramaic, and also knows Spanish. He received his episcopal ordination, and was installed as Eparch on June 14, 2014.

On August 9, 2017, Pope Francis named Kalabat as administrator of Eparchy of Addai of Toronto.

See also
 

 Catholic Church hierarchy
 Catholic Church in the United States
 Historical list of the Catholic bishops of the United States
 List of Catholic bishops of the United States
 Lists of patriarchs, archbishops, and bishops

References

Further reading

External links 

 Chaldean Catholic Eparchy of Detroit Official Site
 Bishop Frank Yohana Kalabat 

1970 births
Living people
Chaldean bishops
American Eastern Catholic bishops
University of San Diego alumni
Bishops appointed by Pope Francis